Sir Ian McKellen is an English actor of the stage and screen.

He has received two Academy Award nominations. He received his first nomination for Best Actor for his performance as James Whale in the period drama Gods and Monsters (1998). His second nomination was for Best Supporting Actor for his performance as Gandalf the Grey in Peter Jackson's Lord of the Rings: The Fellowship of the Ring (2001). For his work in theatre he received two Tony Award nominations winning for Best Actor in a Play for his performance as Antonio Salieri in the Broadway production of Amadeus in 1981. For his work on the London stage he received twelve Laurence Olivier Awards nominations, winning six times. For his work on television he has been nominated six times for the Primetime Emmy Award, three times for the Golden Globe Award, six times for the Screen Actors Guild Awards and five times for the BAFTA Award.

Major awards

Academy Awards

BAFTA Awards

Golden Globe Awards

Primetime Emmy Awards

Screen Actors Guild Awards

Tony Awards

Laurence Olivier Awards

Theatre awards

Drama Desk Awards

Evening Standard Theatre Awards

Honorary awards

Critics awards

Critics' Choice Movie Awards

Critics wins

Miscellaneous awards

Annie Awards

Poppy Awards

Satellite Awards

Saturn Awards

Teen Choice Awards

Other

References

External links

 The papers of Sir Ian McKellen, actor are held by the Victoria and Albert Museum Theatre and Performance Department.
 
 
 
 Biography of Sir Ian McKellen, CH, CBE, Debrett's

Lists of awards received by British actor